Gloat is a privately held company that created AI-powered talent marketplace for internal career opportunities. The two-sided platform works to enhance internal mobility by matching employees to more relevant projects, gigs, mentorships, and full-time roles based on their interests, career ambitions, skills, and experiences. Enterprises like Unilever, Schneider Electric, Nestlé, and Mastercard use Gloat's technology to attempt to democratize career development, help with worker agility, and build a more future-ready workforce.

History
Gloat was founded in 2015 by Danny Shteinberg, Ben Reuveni, and Amichai Schreiber. The co-founders currently serve as Chief Marketing Officer, chief executive officer, and Chief Technology Officer, respectively. Additional leaders include Shlomo Weiss, Chief Operating Officer, Anat Gil, VP HR, and Aaron Au, Chief Strategy Officer.

On June 16, 2021, Gloat closed a $57 million Series C funding round led by Accel, with existing investors Eight Roads Ventures, Intel Capital, Magma Venture Partners, and PICO Partners participating. In June 2022, the company closed $90M in Series D round, led by Generation Investment Management.

As of 2021, the software has made connections for over 31,000 gigs.

References

External links
 Official website

Software companies established in 2015
Human resource management software